Dennis Lind (born 3 February 1993 in Roskilde) is a Danish racing driver of Colombian descent who is currently participating in GT World Challenge Europe Endurance Cup and the British GT Championship. He is the nephew and cousin of Formula One drivers Jan and Kevin Magnussen, respectively. Lind currently competes full-time in the GT World Challenge Europe Endurance Cup for JP Motorsport. He is both European and World Champion of Lamborghini Super Trofeo.

Career
Lind started his racing career by karting, driving in Italy but mainly in Scandinavia, throughout 2006 and 2007. In 2008, he competed in various Formula Ford events; he won the single-round North European Championship, he finished second behind his cousin Kevin Magnussen in the Danish Championship and entered the Benelux Formula Ford Championship. This got him invited to two 2008 British Formula Ford races at Circuit de Spa-Francorchamps. He finished 15th and 21st.

Lind's 2009 season looked much alike the year before; he was first in the Danish, seventh in the North European and sixteenth in the Benelux Championship. This got him invited to the annual Formula Ford Festival. He finished fourteenth. In 2010, Lind entered the full season of British Formula Ford and finished fifteenth. He won the Formula Ford Festival.

In 2011, Lind entered only half the races of the 2011 ADAC Formel Masters season, but still finished tenth. He also finished sixth and eighth in the last weekend of the German F3 during the same year. He then competed in the Auto-G Danish Thundersport Championship (which is essentially Danish Touring Cars), coming second just behind his uncle Jan Magnussen in 2012 and then became DTC Champion of 2013.
2014 saw Lind's return to formula racing where he took part in the Formula Acceleration 1. He also drove for AF Corse during the first weekend of the ELMS at Silverstone.

In 2015 Dennis competed in the Danish Thundersport Championship finishing 2nd in the standings after mechanical issues spoiled his season finale. In 2016 saw Dennis attempt to drive in both DTC and Lamborghini Super Trofeo but after a few rounds it became nonviable and his sole focus was on the Super Trofeo season due to its international reputation and appeal. During the season Dennis became part of the Lamborghini Squadra Corse Young Driver Program and on December the 4th 2016 became double champion of Super Trofeo in both European and World championships at the final round in Valencia.

In 2017 Dennis contested occasional races in Lamborghini Super Trofeo as well as a 3 race-long debut in the Blancpain GT Europe Endurance series.

2018 saw Lind take part in the Blancpain GT Asia series, with Martin Kodrić sharing driving duties. They finished as champions.

2019 was a bitter-sweet season for Lind he played a big part in FFF Orange1 Racing Team's and Lamborghini's successful factory effort at securing the Blancpain GT Europe Endurance championship but due to serious illness, Lind had to sit out the final round of the season and therefore couldn't be scored as a champion.

In 2022 Lind continued racing GT3 machineries, signing a contract with JP Motorsport and driving in GT World Challenge Europe Endurance Cup.

Lamborghini Super Trofeo
In 2016 Dennis had the opportunity to drive for Italian team Raton Racing in the 2016 Lamborghini Super Trofeo season. Pre-Season testing went very well and his drive for the entire championship as a solo driver in the PRO category was confirmed. The season started very well with Lind taking the win at the first round in Monza but was hampered by a brake issue in the second race which removed all chance of a good result. The second round at Silverstone looked to be an improvement on the first round at Monza, with Lind taking the first race convincingly controlling his lead from start to finish but in race two lapped traffic caused an incident and caused Dennis to spin losing the lead and subsequent positions to finish 8th in class.

The third round at Paul Ricard was arguably Dennis Lind's best performance during the European championship. He endured a strong challenge in both races from closest rival Vito Postiglione but went on to win both races despite the pressure. Round 4 at Spa proved to be relatively difficult with Lind only managing to find a 7th and 2nd place. Round 5 was even worse with 10th place in the first race and only 3rd in the second race. Lind's championship hopes hung in the balance amidst the consistent challenge of Postiglione and late bloomer in the championship, the Latvian driver Haralds Schlegelmilch.

The final round at Valencia which was also host to the World Finals had 4 races installed. Two for the European, Asian and North American championships respectively and the latter 2 races for the main event, the world final.
The first race of the weekend Dennis won with a fairly small margin to Postiglione. The second race was less convincing from Lind, but nevertheless sealed the European Championship with a 5th position.

The first race of the world finals didn't go in his favour and he was set to finish 3rd but with a few laps remaining Loris Spinelli had a spectacular engine failure thus promoting Lind to second place and Postiglione to 1st. The battle was on for the final round of the season in race two of the world finals when the rain came down, and it came down hard. Lind started 4th but made his way to 2nd within the first few running laps after the race started under safety car. During the first few laps under green flag conditions, Postiglione lost touch from the lead pair of Lind and Spinelli and then subsequently dropped further back to 6th place and then had a spin, Lind knew that the 2nd place he currently would be good enough to take the world title but it would not prove so easy. The race went on and the rain got even harder, with standing water all around the track. During the majority of the race Vito Postiglione had a storming drive after his mistake and fought his way back to second behind Haralds Schlegelmilch.

Due to the amount of standing water at Turn 9 both Schlegelmilch and Postiglione were caught out but it was Vito Postiglione that capitalized on it and got himself back into 3rd place and therefore was in the driving seat for the world title. The Raton Racing team notified Lind of the championship situation via pit-to-car radio and as such, Dennis knew he had to attack for 1st place in these treacherous conditions to take his destiny into his own hands, he had no other choice. In what would prove to be the final few moments of the race Dennis skillfully passed Spinelli for the race lead and the win and sealed a fantastic season off with both World and European Lamborghini Super Trofeo championships.

Racing record

Career summary

Complete British GT Championship results 
(key) (Races in bold indicate pole position) (Races in italics indicate fastest lap)

Complete Formula Acceleration 1 results 
(key) (Races in bold indicate pole position) (Races in italics indicate fastest lap)

References

External links
 
 

1993 births
Living people
People from Roskilde
Danish racing drivers
Formula Ford drivers
ADAC Formel Masters drivers
German Formula Three Championship drivers
European Le Mans Series drivers
24H Series drivers
British GT Championship drivers
GT World Challenge America drivers
Sportspeople from Region Zealand
ADAC GT Masters drivers
AF Corse drivers
Ma-con Motorsport drivers
W Racing Team drivers
Fluid Motorsport Development drivers
Audi Sport drivers
Performance Racing drivers
RC Motorsport drivers
G2 Esports players
Target Racing drivers
Saintéloc Racing drivers
Lamborghini Squadra Corse drivers
Lamborghini Super Trofeo drivers